Paenibacterin is a mixture of antimicrobial lipopeptides isolated from Paenibacillus thiaminolyticus.  It contains three isomeric compounds which differ by the fatty acid side chain.

References

Antimicrobial peptides
Lipopeptides
Paenibacillaceae